Cryptoholcocerus is a monotypic moth genus in the family Cossidae. Its sole species, Cryptoholcocerus mongolicus, is found in south-eastern Kazakhstan, Kirghizistan, Uzbekistan, Tajikistan, Pakistan, Afghanistan and north-western China, where it is found at elevations ranging from 400 to 3,750 meters.

The length of the forewings is 20–28 mm for males and 28–35 mm for females. The forewings are grey with a reticulate pattern. The hindwings have a reticulate pattern and a large dark spot in the central area. Adults are on wing from June to August.

References

Natural History Museum Lepidoptera generic names catalog

Cossinae
Moths described in 1882
Monotypic moth genera
Moths of Asia